John Thwaites may refer to:

John Thwaites (British politician) (1815–1870)
John Thwaites (Australian politician) (born 1955)
John Anthony Thwaites (1909–1981), British art critic and author
Jack Thwaites (1902–1986), British-Australian conservationist